Group D of the 2013 Fed Cup Europe/Africa Zone Group I was one of four pools in the Europe/Africa zone of the 2013 Fed Cup. Four teams competed in a round robin competition, with the top team and the bottom team proceeding to their respective sections of the play-offs: the top team played for advancement to the World Group II Play-offs, while the bottom team faced potential relegation to Group II.

Standings

Round-robin

Slovenia vs. Luxembourg

Netherlands vs. Bulgaria

Slovenia vs. Netherlands

Bulgaria vs. Luxembourg

Slovenia vs. Bulgaria

Luxembourg vs. Netherlands

See also 
 Fed Cup structure

References

External links 
 Fed Cup website

2013 Fed Cup Europe/Africa Zone